The 2014–15 Newcastle Jets FC season was the club's 14th season since its establishment in 2000. The club participated in the A-League for the 10th time and the FFA Cup for the first time.

Players

Squad information

Current Trialists
  Allan Welsh –  Croydon Kings – signed
  Ryan Ensor –  SWQ Thunder
  Brendan Cholakian –  Manly United
  Iqi Jawadi –  South Melbourne
  Robert Paratore –  Leicester City

From youth squad

Transfers in

Transfers out

Technical staff

Statistics

Squad statistics

|-
|colspan="19"|Players out on loan:

|-
|colspan="19"|Players no longer at the club:

Pre-season and friendlies

Competitions

Overall

A-League

League table

Results summary

Results by round

Matches

FFA Cup

Awards
 Newcastle Jets Player of the Year – Andrew Hoole
 Newcastle Jets Youth Player of the Year – Nick Cowburn
 Ray Baartz Medal – Andrew Hoole

References

External links
 Official Website

Newcastle Jets
Newcastle Jets FC seasons